Crataegus scabrifolia is a hawthorn from China that grows at altitudes between 1500 and 3000 m in areas with high rainfall. It is usually a large shrub or small tree, and usually without thorns. The edible fruit are large for a hawthorn, up to 2.5 cm in diameter, red or yellow, and are sold in local markets. The tree is apparently not cultivated outside China.

See also
 List of Crataegus species with yellow fruit

References

scabrifolia
Flora of China